Cailín (Irish "girl") may refer to:

 A variant of the feminine name Colleen
 Cailin, Meichuan, a village in Meichuan, Wuxue, Huanggang, China

Music
 Cailin (song), by Unwritten Law
 Cailín Óg a Stór (Irish: "O Darling Young Girl") traditional Irish melody 
 "Cailín na gruaige doinne" (The Brown-Haired Girl) The Chieftains (album)

See also